Obokuitai (Obogwitai) is a Lakes Plain language of Papua, Indonesia. It is named after Obogwi village in East Central Mambermano District, Mamberamo Raya Regency.

Obokuitai, Sikaritai, and Eritai constitute a dialect cluster.

Phonology 
The following discussion is based on Jenison & Jenison (1991).

Unusual phonological features of Obokuitai and other Lakes Plain languages are the complete lack of nasals, even allophones, and a series of extra high or fricativized vowels that developed from loss of a following stop consonant. Obokuitai has one of the smallest phonemic inventories in the world, equal to the Pirahã and Rotokas languages.

Consonants 

The small consonant inventory is typical of Lakes Plain languages.

Obokuitai does have some more sounds as allophones. 
The voiced velar stop, [g], occurs syllable initial following a syllable final /k/. For example, /dikka/ -> [digga], 'husband of wife's sister'.

The voiced alveolar tap or flap, [ɾ], occurs between vowels in the syllable initial position and also as the second member of a consonant cluster in the syllable initial position. For example, /bɛda/ -> [bɛɾa], 'kind of sweet potato'.

Vowels 
Obokuitai has five vowels.

Tone 
Like the other Lakes Plain languages, Obokuitai is tonal. L, H, and HL pitch contours occur on monosyllabic words. A phonological analysis of the tone system remains to be completed. However, the probable phonemic aspect of the tone is shown through the minimal triad kuik1 'rock', kuik2 'insect' (sp.) and kuik12 'lizard' (sp.).

Pronouns
Possessive pronouns in Obokuitai are:

Verbs
Obokuitai has three verbal prefixes, which are:
ha-: reciprocal
ke-: causative
be-: applicative

Some examples of verbs with the prefixes, as compared to the verb roots without them:

There are two aspectual verbal suffixes:
-kua: imperfective
-di ~ -ei ~ Ø: perfective

These also have "background" forms, used with what Foley refers to as "backgrounded collateral clauses".
-hoíd: imperfective
-hi: perfective

Particles
Final particles in Obokuitai:
ke: exclamatory
ia: certainty
te ~ toi: imperative
bi: yes-no interrogative
se: information interrogative
beid: negative

References

Lakes Plain languages
Languages of western New Guinea